Two Sisters or The Two Sisters may refer to:

Films
 Two Sisters (1929 film), a 1929 drama film by Scott Pembroke, featuring Boris Karloff
 Two Sisters (1991 film), a Canadian animated short film by Caroline Leaf
 The Two Sisters (1950 film), an Italian drama film directed by Mario Volpe
 The Two Sisters (film), a 2007 mystery/suspense film by Terri Dawn Arnold
 Two Sisters (2019 film), a 2019 Malaysian Mandarin-language horror mystery film

Music
 "Two Sisters" (Fiction Plane song), 2007
 "The Twa Sisters" (aka "Two Sisters"), a 17th-century English murder ballad
 "Two Sisters" (The Kinks song), 1967
 "Two Sisters" (Andrew Bird song), 1992

Places
 Battle of Two Sisters, a 1982 engagement of the Falklands War
 Two Sisters Ridge, a location in the Falkland Islands
 USS Two Sisters (1856), a schooner during the American Civil War
 Two Sisters (Western Australia), two islands near Albany
 Two Sisters, a mountain peak in the US state of Montana

Stories
 The Two Sisters (novel), a 1926 romance book by H. E. Bates
 Two Sisters (novel), a 1970 novel by Gore Vidal
 Two Sisters (aka 2 Sisters), a 2005 graphic novel by Matt Kindt
Two Sisters, a play by Gail Louw

Paintings
 Two Sisters, 1901, by William-Adolphe Bouguereau
 Two Sisters (On the Terrace), 1881, by Pierre-Auguste Renoir
 Two Sisters of Old Hawaii, 1933, by Madge Tennent
The Two Sisters (Lemmen painting), an 1894 double portrait by Georges Lemmen
The Two Sisters (Chassériau painting), an 1843 painting by Théodore Chassériau of his two sisters

See also
 A Tale of Two Sisters (disambiguation)
 Two Sisters from Boston, a 1946 musical comedy film by Henry Koster